Jacques Déprez (3 March 1938 – 20 November 2020) was a French hurdler. He competed in the men's 110 metres hurdles at the 1960 Summer Olympics.

References

External links
 

1938 births
2020 deaths
Athletes (track and field) at the 1960 Summer Olympics
French male hurdlers
Olympic athletes of France
Place of birth missing